Jinan Metro, also known as Jinan Rail Transit is a rapid transit system serving Jinan, the capital of Shandong province, China.

Lines

Line 1

Line 1 runs north–south in the western part of the city. The line began operating on 1 April 2019, and cost CN¥12 billion to build.

Line 2

The line began operating on 26 March 2021.

Line 3

It is completely underground. The line began operating on 28 December 2019.

Rolling stock
Lines 1, 2, and 3 use Type B rolling stock. Lines 2 and 3 have six-car trains, whereas Line 1 has four-car trains with provision for an increase to six-car trains in the future.

Lines 4, 6, 7, 8 and 9 will use high capacity Type A rolling stock.

History
Planning of the system began in the early 2000s but was delayed due to 2008 world economic crisis. After years of preparation, construction started at an official ceremony on 29 December 2013. Line 1 was opened on 1 April 2019.

The first phase of construction was adopted by National Development and Reform Commission and included three lines (1, 2, and 3) with 47 stations. The first phase has a total length of :  underground,  elevated, and  transitional. It is expected to cost up to ¥48.9 bn.

The fare system is based on existing smart card technology.

Future

Phase 2 Construction Plan (2020–2025)
Phase 2 was approved by the National Development and Reform Commission on 30 October 2020. Phase 2 consists of 159.6 km of new subway and is proposed to start construction in 2020.

Network Map

See also
 List of metro systems

References

External links

 Official site  

 
Rapid transit in China
Rail transport in Shandong